The 2002 Solihull Metropolitan Borough Council election took place on 2 May 2002 to elect members of Solihull Metropolitan Borough Council in the West Midlands, England. 
One third of the council was up for election and the Conservative Party stayed in overall control of the council.

Campaign
Before the election the Conservatives held 29 seats, compared to 14 for Labour and 8 for the Liberal Democrats, with 17 seats being contested in the election. The Conservatives had held a majority on the council since gaining 4 seats at the 2000 election.

Issues in the election included a proposed development by Asda in Shirley, the fate of the Accident and Emergency department at Solihull hospital and new housing developments. Labour also wanted to address a north-south divide in the council area and opposed any transfer of council housing from council control.

Election result
The results saw the Conservatives stay in control of the council with 29 of the 51 seats after only 2 seats changed parties. A couple of former councillors returned to the council, the former Labour leader of the council Michael Corser in Chelmsley Wood and Liberal Democrat June Gandy in Shirley East.

This result had the following consequences for the total number of seats on the council after the elections :

Ward results

By-elections between 2002 and 2003

References

2002 English local elections
2002
2000s in the West Midlands (county)